South Black Rock is a small island with an area of <1 ha, in Bass Strait, south-eastern Australia.  It is part of Tasmania’s Hunter Island Group which lies between north-west Tasmania and King Island.

Fauna
Breeding seabird and shorebird species include fairy prion, common diving-petrel, Pacific gull and black-faced cormorant.

References

Islands of Tasmania